Chump or The Chumps may refer to:

Arts and entertainment

Films
 The Chump (1921 film), a short starring Billy Bletcher
 The Chump (1934 film), with Hal Skelly, Lina Basquette and Sally Starr
 The Chump, a 2002 film directed by Sam Fell

Music
 "Chump", a track on the album Dookie by Green Day
 "Chump", a track on the album Novelty (1992) by Jawbox

Television
 CHUMP (Criminal Headquarters for Underworld Master Plan), an espionage organization in the 1970s television show Lancelot Link, Secret Chimp
 "The Chump" (The Office), an episode of the American sitcom The Office

Other uses
 Chump, a lamb meat cut (UK)
 W Chump and Sons, a television production company founded in 2015 that produced The Grand Tour
 The Chumps, nickname for NASA Astronaut Group 20

See also
 
 
 Champ (disambiguation)
 Champs (disambiguation)
 Chump Change (disambiguation)